Peritrechus convivus is a species of dirt-colored seed bug in the family Rhyparochromidae. It is found in Europe and Northern Asia (excluding China), Central America, and North America.

References

Further reading

 

Rhyparochromidae
Articles created by Qbugbot
Insects described in 1851